Pobbathiri Township is one of Naypyidaw Union Territory's eight townships, located south of Mandalay Region in Burma.

History
Pobbathiri Township formerly part of Mandalay Division. The township was designated as one of the original townships constituting the new capital region of Naypyidaw on 26 November 2008 by the Ministry of Home Affairs (MOHA).

Pobbathiri is derived from Pali , and literally means "splendor of the east."

Demographics

2014

The 2014 Myanmar Census reported that Pobbathiri Township had a population of 116,491. The population density was 482.9 people per km². The census reported that the median age was 26.0 years, and 97 males per 100 females. There were 27,616 households; the mean household size was 4.0.

References

Naypyidaw